Lu Yen-hsun was the defending champion but withdrew before the tournament began.

Miomir Kecmanović won the title after defeating Radu Albot 6–4, 6–4 in the final.

Seeds

Draw

Finals

Top half

Bottom half

References
Main Draw
Qualifying Draw

China International Suzhou - Singles